Yellagiri is a village in Nalgonda district in Telangana, India. It falls under Choutuppal mandal.
Karya Siddhi Hanuman Devasthanam is located in this village.

References

Villages in Nalgonda district